Lost Holiday: The Jim And Suzanne Shemwell Story is a 2007 Lifetime Television movie starring Jami Gertz and Dylan Walsh. It was based on a true story.

Plot
In Idaho, an estranged couple are trapped in a blizzard while on vacation just before Christmas. The couple goes snowmobiling in the mountains, but this excursion turns into a life-threatening situation. They confront the reason for their separation as they fight to stay alive.

Cast
Dylan Walsh – Jimmy Shemwell
Jami Gertz – Suzanne Shemwell
Aaron Pearl – Blake Thompson
Julia Maxwell – Miranda Shemwell
Alex Arsenault – Keith
Judith Buchan – Mary Ann Ford
David Haysom – MP
Rainer Kahl – MP
Jacey Kenny – Kate
Barb Mitchell – Deborah Markle
Brooklynn Proulx – Taryn Shemwell
Joe Norman Shaw – Shérif Tierney

References

External links

Lifetime (TV network) films
2007 television films
2007 films
American films based on actual events
2000s English-language films